Mathematical Applications Group, Inc. (a.k.a. MAGi or MAGi/SynthaVision) was an early computer technology company founded in 1966 by Dr. Philip Mittelman and located in Elmsford, New York, where it was evaluating nuclear radiation exposure. By modeling structures using combinatorial geometry mathematics and applying monte carlo radiation ray tracing techniques, the mathematicians could estimate exposures at various distances and relative locations in and around fictional structures. In 1972, the graphics group called MAGi/SynthaVision was formed at MAGi by Robert Goldstein.

It was one of four companies hired to create the CG animation for the film Tron. MAGi was responsible for most of the CG animation in the first half of Tron, while Triple-I worked mainly on the second half of the film. MAGi modeled and animated the light cycles, recognizers and tanks.

Product and legacy 
MAGi developed a software program called SynthaVision to create CG images and films. SynthaVision was one of the first systems to implement a ray tracing algorithmic approach to hidden surface removal in rendering images. The software was a constructive solid geometry (CSG) system, in that the geometry was solid primitives with combinatorial operators (such as Boolean operators). SynthaVision's modeling method does not use polygons or wireframe meshes that most CG companies use today. The combination of the solid modeling and ray tracing (later to become plane firing) made it a very robust system that could generate high quality images.

MAGi created the world's first CG advertisement for IBM. It featured 3D letters that flew out of an office machine.

History 
In 1972, MAGi/SynthaVision was started by Robert Goldstein, with Bo Gehring and Larry Elin covering the design and film/television interests, respectively.

Two of the first television commercial applications were storyboarded by Texas artist, Gordon Blocker in 1973-4 for the Texas Commerce Bank "Flag Card" commercial and a news open for KHOU-TV (CBS) in Houston, Texas.

Tron 
In 1981, MAGi was hired by Disney to create half of the majority of the 20 minutes of CG needed for the film Tron. Twenty minutes of CG animation, in the early 1980s, was extremely gutsy, and so MAGi was a portion of the CG animation, while other companies were hired to do the other animation shots. Since SynthaVision was easy to animate and could create fluid motion and movement, MAGi was assigned with most of Tron's action sequences. These classic scenes include the light cycle sequence and Clu's tank and recognizer pursuit scene. Despite the high quality images that SynthaVision was able to create, the CSG solid modeling could not create anything with complex shapes and multiple curves, so simpler objects like the light cycles and tanks were assigned to MAGi. MAGi was given $1.2 million to finance the animation needed for Tron. MAGi needed more R&D and many other engineers who were working in government contracts at MAGi were assigned into MAGi's "SynthaVision" division.

MAGi sped up the process of supplying its work to Disney Studios in Burbank by a transcontinental computer hook-up. Before each scene was finalized in MAGi's lab in Elmsford, New York, it was previewed on a computer monitor at Disney. Corrections could then be made in the scene immediately. Previously, the only way of previewing the scene was to film it, ship it to Burbank, get corrections made, ship it back to Elmsford, and continue this "ping-ponging" until the scene was correct. The computer link cut between two-and-a-half to five days from the creation of each scene.

During the production of Tron, animators and computer image choreographers Bill Kroyer and Jerry Rees invited John Lasseter (who would later co-found Pixar) to see some of the light cycle animation. Lasseter said in "The Making of Tron" featurette that the light cycle animation was the first CG animation he had ever seen.

After Tron 
In 1983, Disney commissioned MAGi to create a test film featuring characters from the children's book Where the Wild Things Are. The Wild Things test used CGI animation for the backgrounds and traditional 2D animation for the characters "Max" and his dog. Animators John Lasseter and Glen Keane of Disney directed the test for Disney. At MAGi, Larry Elin directed Chris Wedge and Jan Carle and produced a 3D background pencil test based on Disney's story animatics. Lasseter and Keane at Disney then hand animated over the CG background wireframes. A tight bi-coastal production loop was designed. MAGi programmer Josh Pines developed film scanning software to digitized and cleanup the final hand drawn character film footage from Disney. The scanning software adapted to produce cleaner digitized images. Concurrently an ink and paint system was written by Christine Chang, Jodi Slater and Ken Perlin for production. This early paint system would fill in color within character line borders, apply shadow,  highlight and a blur to the color areas in order to produce an airbrush 2 1/2 D effect. The final painted characters and CG rendered backgrounds were digitally composited, color corrected and light scanned back onto film with a Celco camera for lab processing and delivery back to Disney.

In 1984, MAGi opened an office in Los Angeles, California. This office was headed by Richard Taylor, who worked as Special Effects Supervisor while at Triple-I.  Taylor, Wedge and Carle directed a test for a Disney film Something Wicked This Way Comes.  The software and computing hardware proved insufficient for the proposed animation and effects. The Los Angeles office was closed shortly after its establishment.

Also in 1984 Michael Ferraro and Tom Bisogno began production on a short film “First Flight” for the SIGGRAPH '84 Electronic Theater. In order to achieve the organic textures such as clouds, water and bark envisioned, they proposed an artists programming language (KPL) to Ken Perlin to use for the production. Perlin and Josh Pines finalized revision 1 of KPL in time to be used for some effects on the film. KPL was extremely fast since it utilized a reverse polish stack computation method. Carl Ludwig would later use KPL to great effect on ocean cycloid images and realistic cloud formations. Perlin noise and organic procedural textures were also created by Ken Perlin as early built-in image functions for the KPL programming language.

Much of the MAGi/SynthaVision software was Fortran-based with a Ratfor interface for the artists to use.  In 1985 Josh Pines argued to use the Unix programming environment for any future software and production programming design. Michael Ferraro, Carl Ludwig and Tom Bisogno began initial design of an open CG animators programming environment with a C-like interface (Hoc) for the artists and procedural functionality like Perlin's KPL.

Soon after, the SynthaVision software was sold to Lockheed's (CADAM) division as the foundation of ISD (Interactive Solids Design) and MAGi was formally sold to a Canadian firm, Vidmax (which later went defunct), and many of the employees left to other CG companies and universities.

Phillip Mittelman, the founder of MAGi, died in 2000.

MAGi staff (1975–1985) 
 Dr. Phil Mittleman
 Bo Gehring
 Robert Goldstein
 Harold S. Schechter
 Larry Elin
 Marty Cohen
 Herb Steinberg
 Dr. Eugene Troubetzkoy
 Ken Perlin
 Evan Laski
 Chris Wedge
 Tom Bisogno
 Carl Ludwig
 Jan Carlee
 Gene Miller
 Josh Pines
 Christine Chang
 Elyse Veintrub
 Kevin Egan 
 Paul Harris
 Richard Taylor
 Tom Miller
 David Brown
 Mike Ferraro
 Alison Brown
 John Beach
 Glenn Alsup
 J.A. Lopez

References 

Software companies established in 1966
Computer animation
Visual effects companies
1966 establishments in New York (state)